Priit Suit (also Fritz Suit; 15 March 1881 Tartu – 20 April 1942 Sevurallag, Sverdlovsk Oblast, Russia) was an Estonian politician. He was a member of I Riigikogu.

References

1881 births
1942 deaths
Politicians from Tartu
People from Kreis Dorpat
Estonian Labour Party politicians
Members of the Riigikogu, 1920–1923
Members of the Riigikogu, 1923–1926
Members of the Estonian National Assembly
Estonian people executed by the Soviet Union